Greenwood Cemetery is a public cemetery in West Galena Township in the city of Galena, Illinois. It is located one mile west of downtown Galena at the intersection of US 20 (Ulysses S. Grant Memorial Highway) and Gear Street.

Greenwood Cemetery interments include United States Civil War veterans and casualties along with a number of staff members from President Ulysses S. Grant's administration. Greenwood is an active cemetery and is open to the public.

Notable interments

Notable interments include
 Leo E. Allen
 Augustus Louis Chetlain
 Jasper A. Maltby
 Robert H. McClellan
 William R. Rowley
 John Corson Smith
 John Eugene Smith
 Elihu B. Washburne

External links
 Galena & U.S. Grant Museum
 Jo Daviss County – Greenwood Cemetery
 Greenwood Cemetery: Illinois Digital Archives – Illinois State Library
 
 

Cemeteries in Illinois
Protected areas of Jo Daviess County, Illinois
Galena, Illinois